The north-western wedgesnout ctenotus (Ctenotus pallescens)  is a species of skink found in the Northern Territory in Australia.

References

pallescens
Reptiles described in 1970
Taxa named by Glen Milton Storr